Hazi Aslanov is a Baku Metro station. It was opened on 10 December 2002 and named after Hazi Aslanov.

See also
List of Baku metro stations

References

Baku Metro stations
Railway stations opened in 2002
2002 establishments in Azerbaijan